Bayyad   is a village in Southern Lebanon, located in Tyre District, Governorate of South Lebanon.

Origin of name
E. H. Palmer wrote that the name means "the white spot".

History
In 1881, during the late Ottoman era,  the PEF's Survey of Western Palestine (SWP) described it: "A village, built of stone, with many ruined houses [..], containing about 100 Metawileh, situated on hill-top, surrounded by fig-trees, olives, and arable land ; water supplied from cisterns." 

They further noted: "There are many ruined houses at this village, and a lintel with three crosses upon it, the centre being the largest. Foundations of rough-hewn stones of some building."

References

Bibliography

External links
Biyad, Localiban
Survey of Western Palestine, Map 2:   IAA, Wikimedia commons

Populated places in the Israeli security zone 1985–2000
Populated places in Tyre District
Shia Muslim communities in Lebanon